Donald Esty Jr. is an American politician from Maine. He served as the mayor of Westbrook, Maine and State Senator for Maine from 1986 to 1994.

Political career
Esty was a member of the Westbrook City Council for ten years and served as the body's president for six years before being elected to the Maine Senate. He served as the chairman of the Senate Labor Committee and as Senate Majority Leader from 1993 to 1994. After leaving the Senate Esty was elected Mayor of Westbrook, serving from 1998 to 2003 before losing his bid for reelection.

Personal
He is married to Katherine Esty, who works at IDEXX Laboratories, and has three daughters. Esty taught math at Falmouth High School and was the head coach of the school's soccer and softball teams.

References

Year of birth missing (living people)
Living people
Mayors of Westbrook, Maine
Majority leaders of the Maine Senate
Maine Democrats
University of Maine alumni